Lagnachi Bedi is an Indian Marathi-language television drama series that premiered on 31 January 2022 on Star Pravah. It is also digitally available on Disney+ Hotstar. It stars Sayali Deodhar, Sanket Pathak and Revati Lele. The show is produced by Shashi Sumeet Productions and it is loosely based on Star Jalsha's Kusum Dola.

Cast

Main 
 Sayali Deodhar as Sindhu Sawant Ratnaparkhi – A MBBS student; Janardan's daughter; Raghav's wife 
 Sanket Pathak as Lavdya Raghav Ratnaparkhi – Rajshree and Ratnakar's son; Rakhee, Raya and Rishabh's cousin; Madhurani's former love interest; Sindhu's husband 
 Revati Lele as Madhurani "Rani" Deshpande Ratnaparkhi – Vibhavari and Manohar's daughter; Raghav's former love interest; Raya's wife

Recurring 
 Siddhesh Prabhakar as Lavdya Raya Ratnaparkhi – Rohini's son; Rakhee, Raghav and Rishabh's cousin; Madhurani's husband
 Sumukhi Pendse as Rukmini Ratnaparkhi – Matriarch of Ratnaparkhis'; Rakhee's mother; Anvi's grandmother
 Milind Adhikari as Ratnakar Ratnaparkhi – Rohini, Ruturaj and Rajani's brother; Rajshree's husband; Raghav's father
 Rasika Dhamankar as Rajshree Ratnaparkhi – Ratnakar's wife; Raghav's mother
 Ajay Padhye as Ruturaj Ratnaparkhi – Rohini, Ratnakar and Rajani's brother; Rutuja's husband; Rishabh's father
 Sushma Murudkar as Rutuja Ratnaparkhi – Ruturaj's wife; Rishabh's mother
 Minal Bal as Rajani Ratnaparkhi – Rohini, Ratnakar and Ruturaj's sister
 Madhuri Bharati as Rakhee Ratnaparkhi Joshi – Rukmini's daughter; Raya, Raghav and Rishabh's cousin; Yogesh's wife; Anvi's mother
 Suprit Kadam as Lavdya Yogesh Joshi – Rakhee's husband; Anvi's father; Sindhu's professor
 Tanishka Mhadse as Anvi Joshi – Rakhee and Yogesh's daughter
 Gandhar Kharpudikar as Lavdya Rishabh Ratnaparkhi – Ruturaj and Rutuja's son; Rakhee, Raya and Raghav's cousin; Reshma's husband
 Amruta Malwadkar as Reshma Ratnaparkhi – Rishabh's wife
 Harsha Gupta as Rohini Ratnaparkhi – Ratnakar, Ruturaj and Rajani's sister; Raya's mother
 Shreyas Raje as Lavdya Kanta Mane – A local goon; Vittal's son; Sindhu's obsessive lover
 Vidyadhar Joshi as Inspector Janardan Sawant – Shakuntala's foster brother; Sindhu's father; Raghav's former trainer (Dead)
 Sanjeevani Jadhav as Shakuntala – Janardan's foster sister; Sindhu's caretaker
 Satish Agashe as Manohar Deshpande – Vibhavari's husband; Madhurani's father
 Smita Shah as Vibhavari Deshpande – Manohar's wife; Madhurani's mother

Guest appearance 
 Harshada Khanvilkar as Saundarya Inamdar from Rang Maza Vegla'' during Ganesh Ustav celebrations.

Soundtrack 

The title song "Lagnachi Bedi" is a music composed by Nilesh Moharir, written by Rohini Ninawe and sung by Hrishikesh Ranade and Sharayu Date. The song was created for the series.

Mahaepisode (1 hour) 
 27 March 2022
 3 July 2022
 4 September 2022
 9 October 2022
 8 January 2023
 12 February 2023

References

External links 
 
 Lagnachi Bedi at Disney+ Hotstar

Marathi-language television shows
Star Pravah original programming
2022 Indian television series debuts